John Roxburgh (1806–1880) was a Scottish minister of the Church of Scotland and later of the Free Church of Scotland. He served as the latter denomination's Moderator of the General Assembly in 1866 or 1867.

Life

He was born on 8 March 1806 the son of Archibald Roxburgh (1773–1823), a Glasgow shipping merchant, and his wife, Elizabeth Clark (1777–1813). In 1820 he was living with his father at 21 Charlotte Street in Glasgow, his mother having died.

He studied Divinity at Glasgow University, graduating with an M.A. in 1828 and was licensed to preach by the Glasgow Presbytery of the Church of Scotland in 1831. He then did mission work in Manchester before returning to do mission work in St David's Parish in Glasgow then in Barony parish.

He was ordained at St John's Church in Dundee in 1834. In 1836, due to great expansion, his parish was split to create a new quoad sacra church called St Peters.

He left the established church in the Disruption of 1843 and joined the Free Church of Scotland, as minister of Free St  John's, Dundee, 1843-1847. In 1847 he moved to the newly completed St John's Free Church near George Square, Glasgow, designed by John Thomas Rochead. He was admitted to Free  St John's, Glasgow, 18 May 1847.

In 1849 he received an honorary doctorate (DD) on 1 May 1849 from Glasgow University. In 1850 he was living at 6 Provanside in central Glasgow.

From 1857 to 1863 he was Convenor of the Home Missions Committee for the Free Church. From 1866 he was assisted at St John's Free by Rev Alexander Whyte. In 1866 he was elected Moderator of the General Assembly (Scott says 23 May 1867).

He lived his final years at 122 Hill Street, a fine Georgian villa in the Garnethill district of Glasgow. He died at his son's house in Weston-super-Mare on 2 November 1880.

St John's Free Church was demolished in 1971.

Bibliography
Cruelty  to  Animals,  a  sermon
The  Nature and  Design  of  God's  Judgments,  a  discourse (Glasgow,  1832)
The  Glory  of  the  Latter House,  a  discourse  (Dundee,  1843)
Sermon III.  (Free  Church  Pulpit,  i.).
Alexander Balfour,  a  Liverpool  Philanthropist
Ernest  Roxburgh  Balfour  (Edinburgh, n.d.)
Memorials  of  John  Roxburgh, D.D.  [by  George  G.  Cameron]  (Glasgow, 1881)
Memorial  Addresses  at  Dawyck  and Drumelzier  (1923).

Family

On 7 June 1836 he married his cousin, Catherine Grey (1811-1899), daughter of George  Gray of Yeaman Shore, Dundee, Esq. (1750-1835) and his wife, Catherine Balfour of Kilmany (1773-1833). 

They had at least ten children but only six lived to adulthood:

 Catherine  Balfour,  born  6  March  1837 (married  Francis  Sharman,  wine  merchant), died  25  March  1908
 Elizabeth,  born 28  January  1839,  died  29  July  1896
 Archibald,  merchant,  Liverpool,  born  6 August  1841,  died  February  1906
 George  Gray, born  5  May  1842,  died  in  infancy
 Janet of  Dawyck,  born  24  February  1844  (married 23  March  1864,  Alexander  Balfour,  merchant, Liverpool),  died  22  February  1923
 Jane  Anne,  born  7  January  1846  (married 1872,  James  Mellis,  minister  of  Presbyterian Church  of  England), Southport
 John, engineer,  born  14  October  1847,  died  December 1871
 Margaret  Campbell,  born  23  May 1849,  died  1857
 Helen  Jobson,  born  5 January  1851  (married  Frederick  Gourlay,  M.D.), died  1879
 Robert,  M.D.,  born  25  April 1853,  died  16th  Feb.  1917.

Roxburgh was also the great-uncle of writer, Catherine Carswell (nee Catherine Roxburgh Macfarlane, born 27 March 1879), whom he christened.

Artistic recognition

He was photographed by Hill & Adamson in 1844.

References

Sources

1806 births
1880 deaths
Clergy from Glasgow
Alumni of the University of Glasgow
19th-century Ministers of the Free Church of Scotland